Pudhukottaiyilirundhu Saravanan is a 2004 Indian Tamil-language romantic adventure film written and directed by S. S. Stanley. The film stars Dhanush and newcomer Aparna Pillai, while Karunas played a supporting role. Sridevi Ashok played Dhanush’s sister role. The music for the film was scored by Yuvan Shankar Raja, while Krishnakanth produced the venture. The film was released on 14 January 2004, coinciding with Thai Pongal.

Plot
Saravanan's parents manage to send him through a severe financial drought, thinking that he would pay off all their debts as soon as he lands in Singapore. Saravanan finds a job in Singapore through an agent and lands there with high hopes of earning three lakhs and sending the money back to his family. Living in a cramped apartment, Saravanan gets into an argument with a Chinese immigrant there. One day, the immigrant burns Saravanan's passport, and Saravanan starts fighting with him. The Chinese man is inadvertently killed in the fight. Everyone thinks that Saravanan is responsible, and he flees.

Shalini lives a luxurious life with her uncle in Singapore. Her parents and other relatives live in India. Shalini's uncle gets into a huge debt and ends up pawning her in a gamble. After losing the bet, he escapes at gunpoint. He finds Saravanan and asks him to take Shalini back safely to her family in India, and in return, he will get the amount of money he has been wishing for, three lakhs, as payment.

With the help of Vimal, Saravanan gets a duplicate passport. He and Shalini walk, hitchhike, and drive through Malaysia, Thailand, and Burma to get to India. Saravanan is injured at a checkpoint.  As they arrive in Malaysia, Shalini falls in love with Saravanan. He tells her that his parents have arranged a marriage for him to a relative that he has not seen. Shalini uses some money that Saravanan earned to have his name tattooed on her chest.  This shocks him, but he is eventually attracted to her.  They arrive in Burma, and Saravanan gets money for food by participating in an arm-wrestling competition. They cross the border into India under the cover of a sandstorm.

Shalini is reunited with her parents safely, who give Saravanan the promised money. She asks him to return in two months if he loves her. Finally on Valentine's Day, he returns to Kolkata and reunites with her.

Cast

Production
S. S. Stanley, who won critical acclaim for his debut in April Madhathil, collaborated with Dhanush, who had given back-to-back hits in Kadhal Kondein and Thiruda Thirudi to make a film. Actress Sridevi Vijaykumar was initially approached to play the leading female role but was not available. Aparna Pillai won the Miss Chennai contest as a student and was sent to other pageants including the Miss Petite International contest in the United States. The director Stanley saw an article which appeared in The Hindu about her trip to the US and asked her to come for a make-up test, before selecting her to play the female lead in the film.

Pudhukottaiyilirundhu Saravanan was the first Tamil film after MGR's 1973 Tamil film Ulagam Sutrum Valiban to have scenes shot in Thailand. The film was shot also in Singapore, Malaysia and Pulicat in the Thiruvallur District of India. The musical scene with Tharika was shot on a large set, complete with waterfalls and a pond erected by art director Santhanam at the Prasad Studios, and took about five days to shoot. The film was sold to distributors for Rs 11 crore, showing the actor's high market value at the box office.

Release
Theatrical rights for Tamil Nadu was sold for a record 11 crore helped by previous Dhanush hits. But the film attracted poor reviews with a critic from The Hindu noting that "Story wise there's nothing much. All the same there are no boring villains or a contrived climax. Intended to be a light film, it stays that way till the end, but the director could have given a thought to the plausibility angle". A critic from Deccan Herald wrote that "While the lanky Dhanush does everything expected of him--fast dances, brilliant fights, and excellent dialogue delivery, the director lets him down with a silly story". Dhanush's fight scene was well received; Aparna, who made her debut in this film, was also praised for her performance. The film was later dubbed and released as Sourya in Telugu. The film was subject to controversy when a song, to which the lyrics had originally been censored, was shown uncut in the movie.

Soundtrack

The soundtrack of the film, composed by Yuvan Shankar Raja and released on 4 December 2003, features six tracks and was hailed as the highlight of the film. Yuvan Shankar Raja himself sang two songs and hero Dhanush sang the song 'Naatu Sarakku', debuting as a playback singer as well. Lyrics were penned by Pa. Vijay, Thamarai, Snehan and Na. Muthukumar.

Tracklist

References

External links 

 

2004 films
Indian road movies
2000s road movies
2000s Tamil-language films
Films set in Thailand
Films shot in Thailand
Films set in Singapore
Films shot in Singapore
Films set in Malaysia
Films shot in Malaysia
Films set in Myanmar
Films directed by S. S. Stanley